Mostapha al-Turk (born 14 July 1973) is a retired Lebanese mixed martial artist. A professional from 2002 until 2010, he competed for the UFC and Cage Rage. He is the former Cage Rage British heavyweight champion.

Background
Born in Beirut, Lebanon, al-Turk and his family moved back and forth between London and Beirut when he was still a toddler. al-Turk had become interested in mixed martial arts after watching a few UFC and PRIDE FC events. He briefly worked in the pharmaceutical industry, before deciding to make mixed martial arts his career. al-Turk had a very accomplished grappling career as well, with his Brazilian jiu-jitsu background. al-Turk was the ADCC European Champion in 2005 and made it to the final of the ADCC Submission Wrestling World Championship, losing to future UFC fighter Gabriel Gonzaga by only three points, further motivating al-Turk to transition to mixed martial arts.

Mixed martial arts career

Early career
Before going professional, al-Turk had 2 amateur fights.

Cage Rage 
Al-Turk fought in the British organization, Cage Rage, around a year after losing his second professional bout. Al-Turk faced former two-time UFC Heavyweight Tournament Champion and longtime PRIDE veteran Mark Kerr. al-Turk again won by punches after the former collegiate wrestling star tapped out due to punches. Al-Turk then fought against former British Cage Rage Heavyweight Champion Tengiz Tedoradze. Al-Turk lost the fight by knockout.

Al-Turk continued to perform with a win over K-1 kickboxer Gary Turner, who tapped due to punches landed by the Lebanese fighter. al-Turk then fought for the British Cage Rage Heavyweight Championship against future Ultimate Fighter contestant, James McSweeney. al-Turk won the fight by TKO due to punches and became the last British Cage Rage Heavyweight Champion, before the organization saw its demise. al-Turk was then offered a four-fight contract in the UFC, which he accepted.

UFC 
At UFC 92, on 27 December 2008, Turk lost at his UFC debut to French kickboxer Cheick Kongo by TKO. Kongo dropped Turk with two right hands, using the ground and pound technique, he knocked out Al-Turk 

Al-Turk next lost to Mirko Cro Cop at UFC 99 by TKO after Cro Cop hammered him with strikes. There was some controversy surrounding the end of this fight as Al-Turk claimed Cro Cop had poked him in the eye right before he succumbed to the head kick. Neither the referee Dan Mirgliotta or Cro Cop noticed any eye pokes. Al-Turk stated that he would petition the loss, but the petition was declined.

Al-Turk was expected to face UFC newcomer Rolles Gracie on 6 February 2010 at UFC 109, but pulled out due to visa issues.

al-Turk instead faced The Ultimate Fighter 10 alumni, Jon Madsen, at UFC 112. Turk lost the bout via unanimous decision and was subsequently released by the UFC.

Championships and accomplishments 
Cage Rage
Cage Rage British Heavyweight Championship (One Time, Last)

Mixed martial arts record 

|-
| Loss
| align=center| 6–6
| Jon Madsen
| Decision (unanimous)
| UFC 112
| 
| align=center| 3
| align=center| 5:00
| Abu Dhabi, United Arab Emirates
| 
|-
| Loss
| align=center| 6–5
| Mirko Cro Cop
| TKO (punches)
| UFC 99
| 
| align=center| 1
| align=center| 3:06
| Cologne, Germany
| 
|-
| Loss
| align=center| 6–4
| Cheick Kongo
| TKO (elbows and punches)
| UFC 92
| 
| align=center| 1
| align=center| 4:37
| Las Vegas, Nevada, United States
| 
|-
| Win
| align=center| 6–3
| James McSweeney
| TKO (punches)
| Cage Rage 27
| 
| align=center| 1
| align=center| 2:06
| London, England
| 
|-
| Win
| align=center| 5–3
| Gary Turner
| TKO (submission to punches)
| Cage Rage 25
| 
| align=center| 1
| align=center| 3:19
| London, England
| 
|-
| Loss
| align=center| 4–3
| Tengiz Tedoradze
| Decision (unanimous)
| Cage Rage 23
| 
| align=center| 3
| align=center| 3:26
| London, England
| 
|-
| Win
| align=center| 4–2
| Mark Kerr
| TKO (submission to punches)
| Cage Rage 20
| 
| align=center| 1
| align=center| 2:29
| London, England
| 
|-
| Win
| align=center| 3–2
| Henry Armstrong Miller
| TKO (punches)
| Cage Rage 18
| 
| align=center| 1
| align=center| 0:56
| London, England
| 
|-
| Win
| align=center| 2–2
| Martin Thompson
| TKO (punches)
| Cage Rage 16
| 
| align=center| 1
| align=center| 3:02
| London, England
| 
|-
| Win
| align=center| 1–2
| Fereidoun Naghizadeh
| TKO (punches)
| Cage Rage 9 - No Mercy
| 
| align=center| 1
| align=center| 2:25
| London, England
| 
|-
| Loss
| align=center| 0–2
| Kassim Annan
| Submission (armbar)
| XFC 2 - The Perfect Storm
| 
| align=center| 1
| align=center| N/A
| Cornwall, England
| 
|-
| Loss
| align=center| 0–1
| Mike Ward
| TKO (punches)
| XFC 1 - Xtreme Fighting Championship 1
| 
| align=center| 1
| align=center| 1:00
| Cornwall, England
|

References

External links
 
 
 London Shootfighters
 Interview in Fighters Only magazine
 Feature from East London & West Essex Guardian Series
 Video: Mark Kerr vs Mostapha al-Turk

1973 births
English male mixed martial artists
Lebanese emigrants to the United Kingdom
Heavyweight mixed martial artists
Mixed martial artists utilizing boxing
Mixed martial artists utilizing Brazilian jiu-jitsu
Lebanese male mixed martial artists
Sportspeople of Lebanese descent
Living people
Sportspeople from Beirut
Sportspeople from London
Ultimate Fighting Championship male fighters
English practitioners of Brazilian jiu-jitsu
Lebanese practitioners of Brazilian jiu-jitsu